The Passion of Marie is a 2012 biographical drama film directed by Bille August, starring Birgitte Hjort Sørensen and Søren Sætter-Lassen. The film's Danish working title, Balladen om Marie, means The Ballad of Marie. It tells the story of the stormy relationship between Marie Krøyer and Peder Severin Krøyer, two of the Skagen Painters, in the late 19th century.

Cast
 Birgitte Hjort Sørensen as Marie Krøyer
 Søren Sætter-Lassen as P.S. Krøyer
 Tommy Kenter as Lachmann
 Lene Maria Christensen as Anna Norrie
 Sverrir Gudnason as Hugo Alfvén
 Nanna Buhl Andresen as Henny Brodersen

Production
Based on the 1999 biography by Anastassia Arnold, The Passion of Marie was Bille August's first Danish film production since Pelle the Conqueror from 1987. It was produced through SF Film Production—the Danish subsidiary of AB Svensk Filmindustri—with support from the Danish Film Institute. It received 1.75 million Norwegian kronor from Nordisk Film & TV Fond. Principal photography began in August 2011, on location in Skagen and Marstrand.

Release
The film was released by SF Film Distribution in Denmark on 27 September 2012 and in Sweden on 12 October 2012.

See also
 Hip hip hurra! (film), another film about the Skagen Painters

References

External links
 
 

2012 films
2012 biographical drama films
2012 multilingual films
2010s Danish-language films
2010s historical drama films
2010s Swedish-language films
Biographical films about painters
Danish biographical drama films
Danish historical drama films
Danish multilingual films
Films based on biographies
Films directed by Bille August
Films set in the 19th century
Films set in Denmark
Films shot in Denmark
Films shot in Sweden
Swedish biographical drama films
Swedish historical drama films
Swedish multilingual films
Cultural depictions of Peder Severin Krøyer
2010s Swedish films